SMASH! Sydney Manga and Anime Show (typically abbreviated to SMASH!) is an annual Japanese pop culture convention held during July/August at the International Convention Centre Sydney in Sydney, New South Wales, and is the largest anime convention in Australia.

Programming 
The convention typically offers an artist circle, art competitions, community groups, cosplay competition and games, karaoke competition, maid cafe, merchandise vendors, panels, stage events, video game tournaments, and workshops. It also hosts the Gunpla Builders World Cup and World Cosplay Summit preliminary. On some years, a concert or after hours event also takes place that feature musical guests.

Organization 
SMASH! is run by SMASH Inc, a non-profit association incorporated in New South Wales that began in 2007. SMASH Inc is controlled by a board elected each year by the members of the association. The board in turn selects a management team responsible for the planning and day-to-day conduct of the convention as well as a staff of volunteers organised into various departments. The board, management and staff total more than 50 people.

Mascots 
The convention features two mascots, a boy, Cyrus, and a girl, Skadi. The mascots were designed in 2007 by Sai Nitivoranant and have been drawn by numerous artists, including guests of the convention, Tan Kit Mun, Alexandra Szweryn and Shaun Healey.

History 
SMASH! was conceived by Katie Huang, an artist and illustrator living and working in Sydney. The event was originally called ComicWorld Sydney and was more closely modelled on the Comic World events held in Singapore, Hong Kong and Taiwan. As the number of people involved in organising the event increased, the focus broadened and the name was changed to SMASH! Sydney Manga and Anime Show.

In the first year, the convention setup the first maid cafe and host club to be at an anime convention in Australia. It was also where The Melancholy of Haruhi Suzumiya and Death Note made their Australian premiere. In 2010, SMASH! hosted the first national final of the Bandai Action Kit Universal Cup held in Australia in conjunction with Hobbyco and Namco Bandai; it was also the first year the convention reached its attendance cap. In 2014, SMASH! began its association with the World Cosplay Summit, holding the Australian Preliminary Final. That same year it also staged the NIPPON World Karaoke Grand Prix Australian Preliminary Final.

In 2020 and 2021, the convention was first postponed, then cancelled due to the Australian Government advice regarding the organisation of public gatherings during the COVID-19 pandemic.

Event History

References

External links

 SMASH! Official Website

Anime conventions in Australia
Annual events in Australia
Festivals in Sydney
2007 establishments in Australia